Edward Dean Winter (June 3, 1937 – March 8, 2001) was an American actor. He is best known for his recurring role, Colonel Samuel Flagg, in the television series M*A*S*H from 1973 to 1979.

His other notable television roles were as U.S. Air Force investigator Capt. Ben Ryan in season 2 of Project U.F.O. (1978–1979); and in Hollywood Beat (1985), 9 to 5 (1986–1988), and Herman's Head (1991–1994).

Winter received two Tony Awards for Best Featured Actor in a Musical nominations for his performances in the original productions of Cabaret (1966) and Promises, Promises (1968). He also appeared in films such as A Change of Seasons (1980), Porky's II: The Next Day (1983) and The Buddy System (1984).

Early career
Winter was born in Ventura, California and began his acting career in Ashland, Oregon as a member of the cast of the Oregon Shakespeare Festival. During the 1961 season, he played Claudius in Hamlet and stayed for an extended repertory season where he appeared in The Boyfriend and Rashomon. He went on to early successes on Broadway. Winter was twice nominated for Tony Awards as Best Supporting or Featured Actor (Musical). The first was in 1967, as Ernst Ludwig in Cabaret, then in 1969 as J.D. Sheldrake in Promises, Promises.

He moved on to television, appearing on the daytime serials The Secret Storm and Somerset.

Later career
Winter was cast on M*A*S*H as Lt. Col. (later Col.) Flagg, becoming one of the program's more memorable and popular recurring characters. He appeared in seven episodes as Flagg during the show's 11-year run. The Flagg character was an intelligence agent (claiming to be C.I.A. several times) who brought a stereotypically paranoid, conspiracy-driven approach to his tasks. In some episodes his character was particularly vicious. Before his introduction as Flagg, Winter had appeared on the series as Captain Halloran. A number of fans have expressed the belief that Captain Halloran might have been one of Flagg's many aliases, especially as he said to Dr. Freedman, "we played poker once," which Captain Halloran had. However, this is debatable, as Halloran was a reasonably amiable character, whilst every other persona Flagg adopted was highly antagonistic, regardless of the alias. Winter reprised the role of Col. Flagg in an episode of the spin-off series AfterMASH in 1984. In 1985 he appeared in the pilot episode of Misfits of Science as an army officer who is killed trying to stop an insane general, played by Larry Linville.

Winter also appeared in the TV show Alice, Season 2 Episode 7. He played Alice's possible boyfriend, Jack. Winter was a recurring character in the first season of the prime time sitcom Soap in 1977–78, portraying Congressman Walter McCallum, who was having an affair with the Tates' daughter, Eunice.

In 1974, he played a pedophile in the Marcus Welby, M.D. episode "The Outrage". The same year, he appeared in the films The Parallax View and The Disappearance of Flight 412. In 1976, he appeared in the crime comedy Special Delivery.

In 1975, he played Wes Greenfield in “The Bob Newhart Show” as an aspiring insurance company Executive. (Season 3, Episode 6 - The Gray Flannel Shrink). 

In 1976, he appeared in a season two episode of Phyllis, playing a boyfriend of Phyllis who comes out as gay. He also appeared in two memorable episodes of Dallas in 1981 as plastic surgeon Dr. Frank Waring, Mitch Cooper's mentor for a bit.

In 1977, Winter appeared in an episode of Lou Grant titled "Housewarming," as a reporter who beat his wife. The same year, he appeared in the popular TV movie The Gathering, also starring Ed Asner, and "Never Con a Killer," the pilot for the crime drama The Feather and Father Gang. In 1976, he appeared in The Mary Tyler Moore Show, in which he played a congressman with a former tie to organized crime. He guest-starred in season one on The A-Team in the episode "Holiday in the Hills" and appeared in the season 5 episode "Road Games".

Winter starred in the 1979 NBC primetime drama Project UFO and was featured in the 1980 film A Change of Seasons. He appeared as the corrupt county commissioner Bob Gebhardt in the 1983 movie Porky's II: The Next Day, the romantic comedy The Buddy System (1984), and in From the Hip (1987), also directed by Porky's director Bob Clark. In 1980 he played Clark Gable in the TV movie The Scarlett O'Hara War. 
In 1982 he appeared in the Magnum, P.I. episode "Heal Thyself". Winter appeared in the season one episode of The A-Team, titled "Holiday in the Hills" in 1983. In 1985 he guest-starred as Capt. Hennessey in Episode 14, Season 4, Rules of the Game, of Cagney & Lacey.

Winter co-starred in the 1986 TV movie A Christmas Gift as Thomas Renfield, with co-star John Denver. Three years later he portrayed Las Vegas entertainer Johnny Roman in Mike Hammer: Murder Takes All. Winter guest-starred in The Golden Girls 1989 episode "Blind Date" as John Quinn, a blind man who dates Blanche despite her reservations due to his disability. He appeared on a 1991 episode of the television series Night Court as Clarence Egan.  He appeared as Charlton 'Charlie' Chambers (as Ed Winter) in a 1990 episode of Columbo,  "Rest in Peace, Mrs. Columbo". Winter had a recurring role on the Fox sitcom Herman's Head from 1991 to 1994. Winter portrayed Mr. Crawford, an executive at Waterton Publishing, where the series lead character Herman Brooks (William Ragsdale) worked.

He appeared in the 1995 Seinfeld episode "The Beard" playing Robert's boss. Winter was featured as the real-life character of Carl Lawson in a 1995 episode of UPN's Real Ghosts, also known as Haunted Lives: True Ghost Stories. He did voice work on such programs as The Real Adventures of Jonny Quest, Duckman, Aaahh!!! Real Monsters, The Angry Beavers, Fantastic Max, Paddington Bear and the animated film Adventures in Odyssey: Shadow of a Doubt.

Death
In 2001, aged 63, Winter died in Woodland Hills, California, of complications from Parkinson's disease. His ashes were scattered into the Pacific Ocean.

Filmography

 The Boston Strangler (1968) as Man in Hallway (uncredited)
 Big Daddy (1973, TV movie)
 M*A*S*H (1973-1979, TV Series) as Col. Samuel Flagg / Capt. Halloran
 The Magician (1974, TV Series) as Ted Winters
 The Parallax View (1974) as Senator Jameson
 The Disappearance of Flight 412 (1974, TV movie) as Mr. Cheer
 Special Delivery (1976) as Larry Pierce
 The Invasion of Johnson County (1976, TV movie) as Major Edward Fershay
 The Mary Tyler Moore Show (1976, TV Series) as Brian Nordquist (senatorial candidate)
 Never Con a Killer (1977, TV movie) as Deputy DA J.C. Hadley
 The Girl in the Empty Grave (1977, TV movie) as Dr Peter Cabe
 Maude (1977, TV episode, The Ecologist) as Perry Flannery
 The Gathering (1977, TV movie) as Roger
 Soap (TV series) (1977-1978, TV Series) as Congressman Walter McCallum
 Woman on the Run (1977, TV movie) as Daniel Frazier
 Rendezvous Hotel (1979, TV movie) as Jim Becker
 Mother and Daughter: The Loving War (1980, TV movie) as Doug
 The Scarlett O'Hara War (1980, TV movie) as Clark Gable
 A Change of Seasons (1980) as Steven Rutledge
 The Big Black Pill (1981, TV movie) as Jerrold Farinpour
 Fly Away Home (1981, TV movie) as Lieutenant Colonel Pace
  Dallas (1981) as Dr. Frank Waring
 Family in Blue (1982, TV movie)
 The First Time (1982, TV movie) as Captain Michael McKenzie 
 Wait Until Dark (1982, TV movie) as Sam Hendrix
 The 25th Man (1982, TV movie) as Captain Mike Houston
 Porky's II: The Next Day (1983) as Commissioner Bob Gebhardt
 The A-Team (1983-1985, TV Series) as Racketeer Johnny Royce / Reporter Mitchell Barnes
 The Buddy System (1983) as Jim Parks
 The Last Honor of Kathryn Beck (1984, TV movie) as Carl Macaluso
 Perry Mason: The Case of the Notorious Nun (1986, TV movie) as Jonathan Eastman
 Stranded (1986, TV movie) as Tommy Claybourne
 There Must Be a Pony (1986, TV movie) as David Hollis
 The Christmas Gift (1986, TV movie) as Thomas A. Renfield
 Mathnet (1987, TV segment from Square One Television) as Clarence Sampson in The Problem of the Missing Baseball (pilot episode, filmed 1985)
 From the Hip (1987) as Raymond Torkenson
 The Golden Girls (1989, TV Series) as John Quinn
 Murder, She Wrote (1989, TV Series) as Capt. Everett Larson in Smooth Operators
 Mike Hammer: Murder Takes All (1989, TV movie) as Johnny Roman
 Held Hostage: The Sis and Jerry Levin Story (1991, TV movie) as Bill Prentiss
 The American Clock (1993, TV movie) as William Durant
 Saved by the Bell: The College Years (1993, TV Series) as Mr. Burke

References

External links

 
 
 Edward Winter at Internet Off-Broadway Database

1937 births
2001 deaths
American male film actors
American male television actors
American male voice actors
Neurological disease deaths in California
Deaths from Parkinson's disease
People from Ventura, California
20th-century American male actors